Luis Agregado Ortega is a politician from Naga City in the province of Camarines Sur, Philippines.

Early life 
Ortega was born in Via Gainza Street in the city of Naga, Camarines Sur on October 9, 1937. He was the second child of Proctoso Bragais Ortega, local politician and Emilia Ayin Agregado.

Political career 
Ortega was introduced to politics by Government|Department of

References

1937 births
Politicians from Camarines Sur
Living people
People from Naga, Camarines Sur
Filipino city and municipal councilors